Paolo Vollmeier (3 October 1929 - 30 November 2017) was a Swiss philatelist who was elected to the Roll of Distinguished Philatelists in 1986.

In 1985, he was awarded the Crawford Medal by the Royal Philatelic Society London for his Storia Postale del Regno di Sardegna dalle Origini all'Introduzione del Francobollo. In 1996 he was awarded the medal again, this time jointly with Vittorio Mancini, for their Storia Postale del Regno di Napoli dalle Origini all'Introdzione del Francobollo.

Selected publications
Storia Postale del Regno di Sardegna dalle Origini all'Introduzione del Francobollo.
Storia Postale del Regno di Napoli dalle Origini all'Introdzione del Francobollo (With Vito Mancini)

References

1929 births
2017 deaths
Fellows of the Royal Philatelic Society London
Philately of Italy
Signatories to the Roll of Distinguished Philatelists
Swiss philatelists